Thanks for the Dance is the fifteenth and final studio album by Canadian singer-songwriter Leonard Cohen, released posthumously through Columbia Records and Legacy Recordings on November 22, 2019. It is the first release following Cohen's death in November 2016, and includes contributions from various musicians, such as Daniel Lanois, Beck, Jennifer Warnes, Damien Rice and Leslie Feist. The song "The Goal" was released with the announcement of the album, on September 20, 2019.

Described as a "continuation" of Cohen's previous studio album, You Want It Darker (2016), the album's vocal tracks were recorded during the same sessions, with Cohen's son and album producer Adam Cohen noting that the album should not be considered an album of "discarded songs or B sides".

Background
The songs on the album comprise "sketches" left over from the sessions for Cohen's final studio album You Want It Darker that were finished by Cohen's son Adam Cohen in a "garage near his father's old house". Regarding the tracks, Cohen noted: "Had we had more time and had [Leonard] been more robust, we would have gotten to them. [We had] conversations about what instrumentation and what feelings he wanted the completed work to evoke sadly, the fact that I would be completing them without him was given."

Critical reception

Thanks for the Dance received critical acclaim. At Metacritic, which assigns a normalized rating out of 100 to reviews from mainstream critics, the album received an average score of 84, which indicates "universal acclaim", based on 25 reviews.

Rolling Stone gave the album 4 stars, praising the album and saying it is "a magnificent parting shot that's also that exceptionally rare thing — a posthumous work as alive, challenging, and essential as anything issued in the artist's lifetime".

The album was a Juno Award nominee for Adult Alternative Album of the Year at the Juno Awards of 2020.

Track listing

Personnel

 Leonard Cohen – vocals (1–9)
 Pietro Amato – horns (8)
 Erika Angell – vocals (8)
 Kobi Arditi – trombone (1)
 Avi Avital – mandolin (2)
 Beck – Jew's harp (3), acoustic guitar (3)
 Romain Bly – trumpet (1)
 Howard Bilerman – recording engineer (8)
 Charlie Bisharat – violin (1)
 Jacob Braun – cello (1)
 David Campbell – conductor (1)
  – choir (7)
 Matt Chamberlain – drums (8), percussion (8)
 Michael Chaves – bass (1,2,3,4,5,7,9), acoustic guitar (1,5,8), claps (3), drums (4), percussion (5), electric guitar (7,8), synthesizer (8)
 Adam Cohen – acoustic guitar (3), claps (3), synthesizer (7), vocals (9)
 Stewart Cole – trumpet (4), flugelhorn (4), clarinet (4), modular synthesizer (4)
 Carlos de Jacoba – acoustic guitar (3) 
 André Deritter – conductor (1)
 George Doering – baritone ukulele (4)
 Andrew Duckles – viola (1)
 Leslie Feist – vocals (4)
 Caimin Gilmore – double bass (1)
 Larry Goldings – flute (1), piano (9)
 Steve Hassett – vocals (9)
 Rob Humphreys – percussion (1)
 Daniel Lanois – piano (1,3), vocals (3), guitar effects (5)
 Lilah Larson – vocals (8)
 Patrick Leonard – piano (6)
 Javier Mas – Spanish laud (1,4), acoustic guitar (2,3,4,6,9), claps (3)
 Dustin O'Halloran – piano (5)
 Georg Paltz – clarinet (1)
 Silvia Perez Cruz – vocals (2,3)
 Zac Rae – felt piano (1,3), ride cymbal (2), Wurlitzer (2,3), vibraphone (2,4), toy piano (2), synthesizer (3,5), kick drum (3), organ (4), zither (5), strings (6,7), piano (7), bells (7), keyboard (9)
 Zoe Randell – vocals (9)
 Mariza Rizou – vocals (2)
 Richard Reed Parry – bass (3)
 Damien Rice – vocals (9)
 Sharon Robinson – percussion (5), vocals (5)
 Shaar Hashomayim Men's Choir – choir (7)
 Jason Sharp – saxophone (8)
 Jessica Staveley-Taylor – vocals (9)
 Mishka Stein – bass (8)
 Aaron Sterling – cymbals (4)
 Dave Stone – string bass (1)
 Alistair Sung – cello (1)
 Molly Sweeney – vocals (8)
 Jamie Thompson – drums (8)
 Maaike van der Linde – flute (1)
 Marlies van Gangelen – oboe (1)
 Josefina Vergara – violin (1)
 Mariam Wallentin – vocals (9)
 Jennifer Warnes – vocals (4)
 Patrick Watson – organ (8), synthesizer (8 and 9), horn arrangement (8)

Charts

Weekly charts

Year-end charts

Certifications

References

2019 albums
Leonard Cohen albums
Albums published posthumously